Supra Corporation was best known as a manufacturer of modems for personal computers, but also produced a range of hardware for the Amiga and Atari ST, including hard drives, SCSI controllers, memory boards, and processor accelerators.

They were purchased by Diamond Multimedia in 1995.

Early history
The company was founded by John Wiley and Alan Ackerman as Microbits Peripheral Products (MPP), a provider of interface products for the Atari 8-bit family. The two of them were friends in high school when they developed various computer hardware for the school computers, and were best known for a 300 baud modem and a printer interface. The company was successful for some time, but a number of factors led to its bankruptcy around 1986, and its reformation as Supra, initially selling hard drives for the Atari ST. Originally from Albany, Oregon, they later moved to Vancouver, Washington.

SupraFAXModem 14400
In 1991 the company arranged a deal with Rockwell International to use their new V.32bis 14,400 bit/s modem chips with an exclusivity arrangement. Their SupraFAXModem 14400 was sold at prices points about half that of the slower 9600 V.32 models of the same era, and its introduction led to a rapid downward spiral in modem pricing.

Notable Dates

1986 - Supra introduces a 10 MB hard drive for the Atari ST.
1987 - Supra introduces the Supra Modem 2400 at $179.
1991 - Supra introduces the SupraFAXModem 14400 at $399 and the SupraFAXModem V.32 at $299.
1994 - Supra purchases PSI Integration
1994 - Supra ships First 28.8 Modem
1994 - Supra ships First Voice Modem
1995 - Supra purchased by Diamond Multimedia
1999 - S3 Graphics purchases Diamond Multimedia

Products
Supra Modems
Supra Voice Modems

Software
FAXCilitate
Supra VoiceMail

References

External links
 List of Supra products for the Amiga

Defunct computer hardware companies
Companies based in Albany, Oregon